Farooqi Girls High School was established in 1978, by Arshad Ali Asim Farooqi and his wife Zahida Asim Farooqi. It is located in Karim Park, Ravi Road, Lahore, Pakistan.
School name is also included in the best schools of lahore list.

There are over 3000 students. The school has got 38 Medals for obtaining top positions from Board of Intermediate and Secondary Education, Lahore.

Attack on school 

On 30 October 2012, the school was attacked by angry protesters due to allegedly blasphemous material. Police investigation showed that it was not true and the school was cleared of all allegations. It started working as usual 90 days after the incident.

References 

Schools in Lahore
1978 establishments in Pakistan
Private schools in Pakistan
Educational institutions established in 1978